Clematis lasiantha, the pipestem clematis, is a creamy-white flowering liana vine, belonging to subgenus Clematis of the large genus Clematis.

Distribution
It is found on the Pacific coast of North America, from the San Francisco Bay Area southwards into Baja California. It grows on hillsides, in chaparral, and in open woodland.

Description
Clematis lasiantha, the pipestem clematis, flowers from January to June.  Its leaves are 3-lobed, and generally grow groups of three to five leaflets, the largest leaves on the plant normally being between 3 and 5 cm in size. The pipestem clematis can be distinguished from the similar (but much more widely ranging) virgin's bower by the fact that pipestems normally only have one flower on each stalk, and at most three, whereas the virgin's bower has multiple flowers on each stem. The pipestem also has more pistils in each flower, but since both species have many, this is not an easy criterion to apply. The virgin's bower is more likely to be found along streams or in other wet places, whereas the pipestem tolerates more open, drier places. The plant attracts butterflies.

References

Further reading

External links 

 Treatment from the Jepson Manual - Clematis lasiantha
 Clematis lasiantha - Photographs @ CalPhotos
 Entry in the online Flora of North America; Clematis lasiantha

lasiantha
Vines
Flora of California
Flora of Baja California
Flora of the Sierra Nevada (United States)
Natural history of the California chaparral and woodlands
Natural history of the Channel Islands of California
Natural history of the Peninsular Ranges
Natural history of the Santa Monica Mountains
Natural history of the Transverse Ranges
Garden plants of North America
Drought-tolerant plants
Flora without expected TNC conservation status